Mission Terra is a German television series.

See also
List of German television series

External links
 

1985 German television series debuts
1988 German television series endings
German children's television series
German science fiction television series
German-language television shows
Das Erste original programming